was a Japanese video game developer and publisher. Most of the staff were part of Human Entertainment. Human's Fire Pro Wrestling series was acquired by Spike after Human ceased operations. In April 2012, the company merged with Chunsoft to become Spike Chunsoft.

History
Spike sold its book publishing business to Aspect in March 1999, and Spike was acquired by Sammy in April. Spike established a game development subsidiary named Vaill (ヴァイル株式会社) which consisted of former Human staff in November 1999, and it was eventually absorbed back into Spike in July 2001. In 2005, Spike was bought by Dwango. In 2012, it merged with its sister company Chunsoft and became Spike Chunsoft. Two games were in development at the time of the merger: Conception: Ore no Kodomo o Undekure! and Danganronpa 2: Goodbye Despair.

Games

Published by Spike

Published by other publishers

Localized

References

External links
 
http://game.spike.co.jp/
IGN's company profile

Spike Chunsoft
Video game development companies
Video game publishers
Video game companies established in 1989
Video game companies disestablished in 2012
Defunct video game companies of Japan
Former Kadokawa Corporation subsidiaries
Japanese companies established in 1989
Japanese companies disestablished in 2012
2012 mergers and acquisitions